Stephen Whisson (1710 – 3 November 1783) was a tutor at Trinity College, Cambridge, United Kingdom, and coached 72 students in the 1744–1754 period.

Biography
Wisson was from St Neots, Huntingdonshire and was the son of a publican.  In 1735, he matriculated from Wakefield School, Yorkshire.

On 29 November 1734, he was admitted as a sizar at Trinity College, Cambridge, becoming a scholar in 1738.

Timeline
 1738/9 BA
 1742 MA
 1761 BD
 1741 Fellow of Trinity
 1744 Taxor
 1751-83 Cambridge University librarian
 1752-80 Senior bursar
 1757-58 Senior proctor
 1739 ordained deacon
 1741 priest
 1746 - c. 1766 Vicar of Babraham, Cambridgeshire.
 1753-71 Rector of Shimpling, Norfolk.
 1771-83 Rector of Orwell, Cambridgeshire.
 1783 Buried in Trinity Chapel.

Notes

External links
 

Alumni of Trinity College, Cambridge
English librarians
1710s births
1783 deaths
18th-century English Anglican priests
Cambridge University Librarians
People from St Neots
People from Babraham